Tulsa International Airport  is a civil-military airport five miles (8 km) northeast of downtown Tulsa, in Tulsa County, Oklahoma, United States. It was named Tulsa Municipal Airport when the city acquired it in 1929; it got its present name in 1963. Despite its name, the Tulsa International Airport is not actually an international airport, and serves only domestic locations. 

The 138th Fighter Wing of the Oklahoma Air National Guard is based at the co-located Tulsa Air National Guard Base. The airport is the global maintenance headquarters for American Airlines.

During World War II Air Force Plant No. 3 was built on the southeast side of the airport, and Douglas Aircraft manufactured several types of aircraft there. After the war this facility was used by Douglas (later McDonnell Douglas) and Rockwell International (later Boeing) for aircraft manufacturing, modification, repair, and research. Spirit AeroSystems currently builds commercial airline parts for Boeing aircraft in part of the building and IC Bus Corporation assembles school buses in the other part. Spirit AeroSystems also builds Boeing wing and floor beam parts and Gulfstream wing parts in a facility on the east side of the airport, just north of runway 26.

The Tulsa Air and Space Museum is on the northwest side of the airport.

History
Duncan A. McIntyre, an early aviator and native of New Zealand, moved to Tulsa in 1919. His first airport was located at Apache and Memorial and opened August 22, 1919. He moved and established a private airport on an 80-acre tract at the corner of Admiral Place and Sheridan Avenue. McIntyre Field had three hangars to house 40 aircraft and a beacon for landings after sundown.

McIntyre evidently closed his airport during the 1930s and merged it with R. F. Garland, a Tulsa oil man and owner of the Garland Airport at 51st and Sheridan Road for $350,000. He ran the airport and became the president of the new venture. This airport would later become the Brown Airport (after a number of owners and names including the commercial airport before it moved to 61st and Yale). In 1940, McIntyre accepted a position with Lockheed Corporation and moved to California.

Charles Lindbergh landed at McIntyre Field on September 30, 1927. He had been persuaded to visit Tulsa by William G. Skelly, who was then president of the local Chamber of Commerce, as well as a booster of the young aviation industry. In addition to being a wealthy oilman and founder of Skelly Oil Company, Skelly founded Spartan Aircraft Company. Lindbergh had already landed at Oklahoma City Municipal Airport, Bartlesville Municipal Airport and Muskogee's Hatbox Field. All of these were superior to the privately owned McIntyre Field. Lindbergh pointed this out at a banquet given that night in his honor.

Opening
The initial municipal airport was financed with a so-called "stud horse note", a promissory note like those used by groups of farmers or horse breeders who would collectively underwrite the purchase of a promising stud horse. The note would be retired with the stud fees paid for use of the horse. In the case of the Tulsa airport, the note would be paid from airport fees. Using this vehicle, Skelly obtained signatures from several prominent Tulsa businessmen put up $172,000 to buy  for a municipal airport. It opened July 3, 1928. The city of Tulsa purchased the airport, then named Tulsa Municipal Airport, in 1929, and put its supervision under the Tulsa Park Board. Charles W. Short was appointed Airport Director in 1929, and remained in this position until 1955.

The first terminal building was a one-story wood and tar paper structure that looked like a warehouse. The landing strips and taxiways were mown grass. Still, it handled enough passengers in 1930 for Tulsa to claim that it had the busiest airport in the world. The Tulsa Municipal Airport handled 7,373 passengers in February 1930 and 9,264 in April. This outpaced Croydon Airport, Berlin Tempelhof Airport, and Paris Le Bourget Airport for those months. Braniff Airways stopped at Tulsa on its original route between Chicago and Wichita Falls, and TWA stopped at Tulsa on its original route between Columbus and Los Angeles. Later in the 1930s, Tulsa became a stop on the American Airlines Chicago-Dallas route.

In 1932 the city opened a more elegant Art Deco terminal topped with a control tower. It was designed by Frederick V. Kershner, a lead architect working for Leon B. Senter. The structure was masonry with rounded corners, resulting in a futuristic appearance. Charles Short decorated the inside walls with a collection of early aviation photographs.

Although many Tulsans had concluded that the 1932 terminal was inadequate to serve the rapidly-growing city by the mid-1950s, the 1932 building served until Tulsa to construct a new terminal, east of the old facility. The new terminal would be designed by noted architect Robert Lawton Jones, who later said that his design was inspired by Mies van der Rohe  Terminal design work began in November 1958 and the completed building opened November 16, 1961; on August 28, 1963, the facility was renamed Tulsa International Airport. The 1932 terminal was demolished in 1969 to make way for a runway expansion project.
In January 1928 Skelly bought the Mid-Continent Aircraft Company of Tulsa and renamed it the Spartan Aircraft Company. It first built a two-seat biplane, the Spartan C3 at its facility near the new airport. Later it would also build a low-wing cabin monoplane as a corporate aircraft, and the NP-1, a naval training plane used in World War II. In 1929 Spartan established the Spartan School of Aeronautics across Apache street from the new Tulsa airport to train fliers and support personnel. The Spartan School was activated by the U. S. Army Air Corps (USAAC) on August 1, 1939, as an advanced civilian pilot training school to supplement the Air Corps' few flying training schools. The Air Corps supplied students with training aircraft, flying clothes, textbooks, and equipment. The Air Corps also put a detachment at each school to supervise training. Spartan furnished instructors, training sites and facilities, aircraft maintenance, quarters, and mess halls.

World War II
The 138th Fighter Wing of the Air National Guard was organized at the Tulsa Airport in 1940 as the 125th Observation Squadron, then renamed when it deployed overseas during World War II. It is still based at TUL.

On January 4, 1941, the War Department announced that Tulsa would be the site of a $15 million plant. The Federal Government built Air Force Plant No. 3 on the east side of the airport. The plant was operated by Douglas Aircraft Corporation to manufacture, assemble and modify bombers for the USAAF from 1942 to 1945; production was suspended when World War II ended. The plant was reactivated in 1950 to produce the Boeing B-47 Stratojet and later the Douglas B-66 Destroyer. In 1960 McDonnell Douglas, the successor to Douglas Aircraft Corporation, continued to use the facility for aircraft maintenance. Rockwell International leased part of the plant to manufacture aerospace products. McDonnell Douglas terminated its lease in 1996. Boeing bought Rockwell International's aerospace business in 1996, and took over much of the facility for aerospace manufacturing.

Postwar
In 1946 American Airlines acquired two former Air Force hangars to start a maintenance and engineering base at Tulsa Municipal Airport.

The April 1957 OAG shows 20 weekday departures on American, 18 Braniff, 6 Continental, 6 Central and 4 TWA. American had a DC-7 nonstop to New York, but westward nonstops didn't get past Oklahoma City, Wichita and Dallas. (In 1947, when transcon flights made at least one stop, American had nonstops from Tulsa to San Francisco and Los Angeles.) In 1979 the airport was also served by Frontier Airlines, Scheduled Skyways and Texas International Airlines.

In 1967 the Tulsa Airports Improvement Trust (TAIT) was established as a public trust to build, operate, and maintain airport facilities for the city of Tulsa. TAIT has no authority to levy taxes and depends on airport revenues to repay airport-related debts.  TAIT is independent of the city, but all board members are appointed by the Mayor of Tulsa and confirmed by the City Council. In October 1978 TAIT leased Tulsa International Airport and other city aviation facilities (other than police and fire heliports) to the city of Tulsa acting through the Tulsa Airport Authority (TAA), which agreed to disburse all airport-related income to TAIT. In July 1989, a lease amendment gave daily airport operation and maintenance responsibility to the TAA.

The Tulsa Air and Space Museum (TASM) was established in 1998 on the northwest side of the airport. The museum added the James E. Bertelsmeyer Tulsa planetarium in 2006.

In December 2000 TAIT guaranteed a loan to Great Plains Airlines in cooperation with the Tulsa Industrial Authority (TIA), the Bank of Oklahoma and the city of Tulsa. The TIA mortgaged Air Force Plant No. 3 for $30 million, which was loaned to Great Plains, and TAIT agreed to purchase the property if the airline defaulted. Great Plains went bankrupt in January 2004 and was unable to repay $7.1 million of the loan, but the loan guarantee was deemed to violate Federal Aviation Administration (FAA) policies prohibiting an airport authority from subsidizing a particular airline, and when the Bank of Oklahoma tried in June 2004 to collect the debt, TAIT declined to purchase the property from the TIA. The TIA promptly sued TAIT for violating the agreement and later added the city of Tulsa to the lawsuit in June 2008. The parties tried to settle the suit in August 2008 by repaying the TIA with $7.1 million of city funds, but this was challenged by a taxpayer group in a qui tam action, and the settlement was deemed illegal in October 2011 by the Oklahoma Supreme Court. The TIA and the Bank of Oklahoma then sued TAIT for breach of contract in March 2013, seeking $15.6 million ($7.1 million in 2004 plus interest). The dispute was finally settled on 31 August 2015 with TAIT agreeing to pay $1.56 million to the TIA and the Bank of Oklahoma's parent company and $125,000 to the Tulsa Regional Chamber.

2010-Pre COVID-19
Allegiant Air began service in 2013 to Orlando/Sanford. In 2015 Allegiant also began service to Las Vegas, Los Angeles International Airport, and St. Petersburg/Clearwater in 2015. TUL also saw a completed terminal renovation in 2015. Allegiant Air has had routes come and go such as New Orleans, Baltimore, and Nashville. Frontier Airlines returned once again in 2018 after pulling out of TUL a decade prior and began year-round service to Denver International Airport. Frontier also has been a victim of short lived routes in this timeframe such as Washington Dulles, San Jose (CA), Orlando, and San Diego. Former Regional Carrier Via Air served TUL with nonstop service to Austin from 2018 to 2019. American Airlines reunited  year-round service to Los Angeles in April 2019 after the route was cut in the late 2000s. Allegiant Air began seasonal service to Destin/Fort Walton Beach in June 2019. During this time frame Runway construction took place along with the return of a jet bridge to gate B9 for Frontier's return.

COVID-19
COVID-19 affected TUL like any other airport during the timeframe. New service on Allegiant Air to San Diego and Nashville along with a new Southwest Airlines seasonal service to Baltimore were all slated to start in the summer of 2020. Nashville was attempted but did poorly as expected considering the circumstance. Ultimately, the route was cut in August of 2020. Tulsa International Airport rebounded very well from COVID-19 thus leading to many new routes and aircraft upgrades. The first began with American Airlines adding nonstop service to Phoenix Sky Harbor in November 2020 to attract leisure travel, this route was very successful, therefore, the route turned into a year-round service just a few months after flights began. Startup low-cost carrier Breeze Airways began service to TUL as the airport scored Breeze as one of their first 15 cities with nonstop service to New Orleans, San Antonio, and Tampa, flights began in the summer of 2021. American Airlines began a surge at Tulsa International Airport adding four new destinations within one year, nearly doubling their network with new services to Austin, Miami, New York–LaGuardia, and  Washington–National. This was huge for TUL as many unserved markets were reunited at long last. Unfortunately, Tulsa did have some msicues to complement the new services. Breeze Airways discontinued service to New Orleans and San Antonio in November 2021. Allegiant Air also attempted service to Austin but was unsuccessful as the route was discontinued a little over a month after beginning. the Austin market in November 2021 as well. This did not last for long though as new services quickly touched down. Allegiant Air began new seasonal service to Phoenix/Mesa and Sarasota in November and December 2021 respectively. Southwest Airlines launched two new routes for the first time in four years with service to Austin to complement American Airlines and the return of Chicago–Midway as Southwest served MDW till 2015 from Tulsa. Breeze Airways launched non-stop service to Nashville in June 2022 and will add Orlando in March 2023.

Facilities
 18L/36R: , surface: grooved concrete
 18R/36L: , surface: grooved asphalt
 8/26: , surface: grooved concrete

As of December 31, 2019 the airport had 92,620 aircraft operations, average 253 per day: 37% commercial airline, 45% air taxi & general aviation, and 20% military. 180 aircraft are based at the airport: 30% single-engine, 13% multi-engine, 44% jet, <1% helicopter and 12% military.

Terminals
The airport has a smaller regional terminal with newly renovated concourses. Concourse A, which houses Allegiant, American and Delta, has 11 departure gates: A1 through A11. Currently, seven of those are in use. Concourse B, opened in 2012, has ten gates, but only seven have jet bridges. Southwest and United use Concourse B.

In 2010, a renovation of the 1960s-era terminal began. The renovations were designed by Gensler and Benham Companies. Concourse B (home to Southwest and United) underwent a $17.9 million renovation between September 7, 2010 and January 18, 2012, including major HVAC replacement along with the more noticeable design changes. These changes include sky lights and raising the somewhat low ceilings in the concourse area, improved passenger waiting areas and gate redesigns. Concourse A (home to Allegiant, Delta, American and US Airways before its merger with American) subsequently underwent renovation and upgrades which were completed in 2015.

American Airlines Maintenance Facility

TUL is the headquarters for all Maintenance and Engineering activities at American Airlines worldwide, and is the maintenance base for the airline's fleet of Airbus A320 family, Boeing 787 and Boeing 737 aircraft – a combined total of nearly 800 airplanes. It employs over 5,000 people, with the majority as licensed aircraft and jet engine mechanics. According to the company, it is one of the largest private employers in Oklahoma.

While many other major domestic airlines (e.g., United, Northwest and US Air) were closing their maintenance facilities and outsourcing the work to major contractors in the early 2000s, American consolidated these activities at the MRO. The airline vowed to make the center as cost-effective as private centers and attract some of this work from other airlines as well. AA won major cost concessions from its own employees, pledged to relocate all its Boeing 737 heavy maintenance work to Tulsa, along with its work on the GE CFM-56 engine work. It also contains a wheel-and-brake overhaul facility and composite repair center.  AA received $22 million in funding from Tulsa's Vision 2025 program that helped it buy machines, tooling and test equipment that only original-equipment manufacturers previously had. This funding helped it get contracts for maintenance work from Synergy Aerospace for F100 aircraft; Aeroserve, for JT8 engine work; GE Aviation Materials, for work on CF6-80 engines; Omni Air International and Vulcan Flight Management for work on Boeing 757 aircraft; and Aero Union for work on A300 landing gear.

Each year, the base performs major overhaul work on about 80% of American's fleet. It also does aircraft maintenance for other carriers on a contract basis.

On 28 February 2020, American Airlines announced an investment of half billion US dollars for the MRO base that will include two new hangars, including a 193,000-square-foot facility big enough to hold six narrow-body planes, such as a Boeing 737, or two larger planes.

Lufthansa Technik Component Services
Lufthansa Technik Component Services LLC (LTCS), a subsidiary of Lufthansa Technik AG, is headquartered at Tulsa Airport. LTCS provides maintenance, repair and overhaul (MRO) services to airlines. The Tulsa location includes the departments of Production and Product Development Engineering, the department of Finance and Controlling as well as Human Resources Management, Strategic Purchasing and a Customer Service team.

Public transportation
There is no public transport service to the main terminal.  No city buses stop at the airport currently. Uber and Lyft are common. A taxi stand is present, but a taxi is not always available. Bus stops are 1.2 to 1.3 miles from the terminal.

Departures / arrivals
Although generally single-level, the entry section of the airport has separate departure and arrival curbs; the inner Apache Drive for departures and outer Airport Drive for arrivals. Baggage claim carousels are located on Airport Drive on the Arrival upper-level curb. TIA has six baggage carousels in service. Currently American Airlines, Delta, and Allegiant on carousels 1, 2, and 3, and Southwest, United, and Frontier are 4, 5, and 6.

Airlines and destinations

Passenger

Cargo

Statistics

Top 10 destination airports

Annual traffic

Non-aviation facilities

Industrial land development
IN 2008, Tulsa Airport Authority began a new industrial land development project. Aerospace is one of the Oklahoma's largest industry clusters with 400 companies that directly or indirectly employ more than 143,000 people with a payroll of $4.7 billion and an industrial output of $11.7 billion. Tulsa is ranked eighth nationally for the size of its aerospace engines manufacturing cluster and 20th for its defense-related cluster.

TUL's central location in the south is easily accessible by a multi-modal transportation network. Each of the sites can be divided into smaller lots to meet any organization's individual needs.

HP Enterprise Services building

The HP Enterprise Services (formerly EDS) building hosting some of Sabre's datacenter servers is located at the Tulsa Airport. The company applied a reflective material on the roof to reduce heat gain, thereby reducing the air conditioning power consumption. In front of this building is a 6-foot sculptured penguin, given to the company as part of a local art campaign by the Tulsa Zoo.

Accidents and incidents
 June 10, 1950: a USAF Douglas C-47 lost power on takeoff and crashed into an aviation school barracks. Three men were injured, one fatally.
 January 6, 1957: American Airlines Flight 327, a Convair CV-240 struck trees 3.6 miles north of the airport and slid some 540 feet. One person was killed out of the 10 on board.
 January 8, 1965: The pilots of Central Airlines Flight 168, a Convair CV-240, diverted to Tulsa and performed an intentional belly landing after repeated unsuccessful attempts to lower the landing gear. The aircraft was substantially damaged but the nine passengers and three crew were not significantly injured.
 September 15, 1987: Eastern Air Lines Flight 216, a Boeing 727 carrying 55 passengers and 7 crew, was seriously damaged in a hard landing. The aircraft was inspected by mechanics at the American Airlines Tulsa maintenance base and cleared to fly; it was then flown to Kansas City and Chicago with passengers, only to be removed from service after skin wrinkles in the fuselage were noticed. An American Airlines official later conceded that the Tulsa mechanics "erred" in their inspection. The accident was attributed to the pilot's decision to disregard a hazardous weather advisory and land in severe winds.
 February 22, 1991: A Mitsubishi MU-2B-60, registration number N274MA, rolled over and crashed in a steep inverted dive after takeoff; the three occupants were killed. Investigators found the right-hand propeller feathered, the left spoiler deployed, and the rudder trim control in the neutral position; emergency procedures for the MU-2 dictated that after an engine is shut down, rudder trim should be applied "as soon as possible" to prevent spoiler deployment. The accident was attributed to the shutdown of one engine for unverified reasons, the failure of the pilot to maintain VMCA, and the pilot's improper emergency procedure.
 December 28, 1992: A Beechcraft C24R Sierra, registration number N3809Q, struck trees during an Instrument Landing System approach at night in low visibility, killing the pilot and two passengers. The accident was attributed to "The pilot's disregard of and descent below the published decision height. Factors were his failure to maintain proper glide path and localizer alignment."
 November 25, 1994: UPS Airlines Flight 732, a Boeing 757-24APF, sustained severe structural damage in a tailstrike on landing. There were no injuries to the two pilots. The accident was attributed to the failure of the pilot to maintain VREF and an improper landing flare. The aircraft was subsequently repaired and placed back in service.
 October 27, 1995: A Beechcraft B95 Travel Air, registration number N9943R, overran Runway 36L on takeoff and struck a tree and railroad tracks, killing the pilot and sole occupant. Investigators attributed the accident to the pilot's failure to remove the flight control gust locks during the preflight inspection, and the pilot's subsequent failure to abort the takeoff.
 July 10, 2010: A Cessna 421, registration number N88DF, experienced a double engine failure and crashed on approach, killing the two pilots and single passenger. The aircraft was low on fuel, but the pilot did not declare an emergency, and accepted a landing clearance on Runway 18R despite being significantly closer to 18L. The accident was attributed to "The pilot's inadequate preflight fuel planning and management in-flight, which resulted in total loss of engine power due to fuel exhaustion. Contributing to the accident was the pilot's use of performance-impairing medications."

Notes

References

Sources

 Manning, Thomas A. (2005), History of Air Education and Training Command, 1942–2002.  Office of History and Research, Headquarters, AETC, Randolph AFB, Texas 
 Shaw, Frederick J. (2004), Locating Air Force Base Sites, History’s Legacy, Air Force History and Museums Program, United States Air Force, Washington DC. 
 Gregory, Carl E.  (2002), Making Lazy Circles in the Sky A History of Tulsa Aviation 1897 to 2000

External links
 Tulsa International Airport (official site)
 Davis-Monthan Aviation Field Register – Tulsa Municipal Airport" Website showing historical photos of Tulsa Airport
 Starbase Composite Squadron – Civil Air Patrol
 Aircraft photos at Tulsa International Airport
 
 

Transportation in Tulsa, Oklahoma
Airports in Oklahoma
Airports established in 1928
1928 establishments in Oklahoma